The Benno Premsela Prize is a former Dutch design prize, awarded every two years from 2000 to 2012 by the Mondriaan Fonds to a person who has played a stimulating role in the field of visual arts, design or architecture. The prize is named after designer Benno Premsela, who died in 1997, and who himself had played a central role in post-war Dutch art and design. The prize consisted of a sum of money of 40,000 euros.

Award winners, a selection  
 2000: Albert Waalkens
 2002: Riekje Swart
 2007: Renny Ramakers and Gijs Bakker
 2009: Suzanne Oxenaar
 2011: Wim van Krimpen

References

External links 
 Oeuvre Prizes, Benno Premsela Prize, Prize for the Art Criticism Fund BKVB

Design awards